DR Handmade Strings  is a manufacturer of guitar and bass strings located in Westwood, New Jersey. DR Handmade Strings was founded in 1989 by Mark Dronge, son of Guild Guitars founder Alfred Dronge, and Dr. Benzion Rapoport. DR is an all American family owned business that is known for its hand craftsmanship and referred to in advertisements as "The Handmade String". They are also known for their colored strings.

External links
Official site
Mark Dronge Interview - NAMM Oral History Library, January 24, 2014

References 

drstrings.com

Musical instrument manufacturing companies of the United States